Taipei Main Station is a railway and metro station in Taipei, Taiwan. It is served by Taiwan High Speed Rail, the Taiwan Railways Administration, and the Taipei Metro. It is also connected through underground passageways to the terminal station of Taoyuan Airport MRT and the Taipei Bus Station. In 2017, it was the busiest station on all three rail systems, with a total of 190 million entries and exits.

Station overview

The central building of Taipei Main Station is a rectangular building in Zhongzheng District with six stories above ground and four stories below ground. The first floor has a large ticketing hall with a skylight and three ground-level exits in each cardinal direction, the second is occupied by restaurants managed by the Breeze group, and all floors above are office spaces. At the B1 level, there are turnstiles for the TRA and THSR platforms, along with a myriad of underground passageways for Taipei Bus Station, the Taoyuan Metro station, and Beimen metro station. Zhongshan Metro Mall, Taipei City Mall, Station Front Metro Mall, and Qsquare all connect on this level as well. TRA and THSR each have two island platforms at the B2 level. As for Taipei Metro, the Bannan line's platforms are located at the south of the station building; the entrances are at the B2 level, and the platforms are at B3. The Tamsui-Xinyi line's entrance is directly under the station building at B3, and the platforms are at B4.

Station layout

HSR services
HSR services 1xx, (1)2xx, (1)3xx, (1)5xx, (1)6xx, and (8)8xx call at this station. The first two southbound trains in the day are 803 (stops at all stations) at 06:26 and 203 (Taipei-Banqiao-Taichung-Chiayi-Tainan-Zuoying) at 06:30. Service 203 is the only train of the day that departs from Taipei Station, and does not depart from Nangang station like most southbound trains do. Although Service 203 departs four minutes later after Service 803, passengers traveling to major cities such as Taichung, Tainan, and Kaohsiung will save more time taking Train No. 203, while Train No. 803 would be more suitable for traveling to nearby cities such as Taoyuan or Hsinchu.

Around the station

（K）K Underground Mall 
 Exit M1／Y2：　TRA／THSR（Entrance North 1）
 Exit M2：Civic Blvd Expressway
 Exit M3：Cosmos Hotel Taipei/ Talk Club Taiwan(美立達留學遊學中心)
 Exit M4：TRA／THSR（Entrance South 1）
 Exit M5：Station Front Plaza
 Exit M6：Caesar Park Hotel Taipei, National Taiwan Museum
 Exit M7：Zhongshan N. Rd.
 Exit M8：Gongyuan Rd, YMCA Taipei

（M）Zhongshan Metro Mall 
 Taipei Bus Station
 Q Square
 Museum of Contemporary Art, Taipei
 Zhongshan Station （R11、G14）, Shuanglian station（R12）

（Y）Taipei City Mall 
 Palais de Chine Hotel Taipei
 Taipei Station Wholesale Market
 （G13）
  Taipei main station（A1）, Taoyuan International Airport MRT

（Z）Station Front Metro Mall 
 Taipei West Bus Station Terminal A
 Shin Kong Mitsukoshi Department Store
 Guanqian Rd, Land Bank, Taiwan Cooperative Bank
  Chongqing S. Rd, First Bank
 North Gate
 Taipei Post Office of Chunghwa Post

History

The first rail station in Taipei was completed in Twatutia in 1891, during Qing rule, when the railway to Keelung was opened for service. Initially, a temporary station was built while a permanent station was constructed in 1897, during Japanese rule (1895–1945).  In 1901, the station was located to the east of its current location. It was rebuilt in 1940 to accommodate growing passenger traffic.

To alleviate traffic congestion caused by railroad crossings in downtown Taipei, an underground railway tunnel between Huashan and Wanhua was built along with the present station building as part of the Taipei Railway Underground Project. When the underground system was completed on 2 September 1989, railway service was moved to the newly completed building (completed on 5 September 1989) and the old building as well as a temporary station were demolished.

The current station was further expanded with the opening of the Taipei Metro. The metro station is connected to the basement of the railway station and opened to passenger traffic in 1997 to the Tamsui–Xinyi line. Extensive underground malls now exist at the front and back of the station, which emulate those found in Tokyo and Osaka, Japan. The station also became a terminus for Taiwan High Speed Rail trains when the network began service in 2007.

Ongoing developments
Taipei station and the area surrounding it have been undergoing renovation since 2005. Japanese architect Fumihiko Maki was chosen to design two skyscrapers that will surround the railroad station. Maki will also oversee the renovation of Taipei station. The height of the taller tower will be 76 stories, whereas the shorter tower will be 56 stories. The two skyscrapers will be constructed on empty parcels found adjacent to Taipei station, above the Taoyuan Airport MRT station.

The station interior underwent renovation work from February to October 2011. Basement restrooms were renovated, the basement and first floor preparations for additional Breeze Plaza retail space began, the large ticket office in the first floor lobby was removed, and additional retail space was allocated. In addition, the flooring on the first floor was completely replaced, fire and evacuation regulations were improved, and solar panels will be installed on the station roof.

See also

 Rail transport in Taiwan
 List of railway stations in Taiwan

References

Notes

References

Bibliography

External links
THSR Taipei Station
TRA Taipei Station
TRTC Route Map & Timetables 

Railway stations opened in 1891
Railway stations served by Taiwan Railways Administration
Railway stations in Taipei
Tamsui–Xinyi line stations
Bannan line stations
Railway stations served by Taiwan High Speed Rail
1891 establishments in Taiwan